Umnak Pass is a strait between the Bering Sea and the North Pacific Ocean in the Aleutian Islands in Alaska.  It lies between Unalaska Island to the northeast and Umnak Island to the southwest.

Notes

References
Merriam-Webster's Geographical Dictionary, Third Edition. Springfield, Massachusetts: Merriam-Webster, Incorporated, 1997. .

Landforms of the Aleutian Islands
Straits of Aleutians West Census Area, Alaska
Straits of Alaska
Umnak
Unalaska Island